St. Francis Xavier's School, Tsuen Wan (SFXS, TW;  or  in short) is located at 60 - 64 Ham Tin Street, Tsuen Wan, Hong Kong. The school is famous in academic and was founded in 1963. It is also the brother school of St. Francis Xavier's College.

In October 2022, it suspended 14 students for "disrespectful behaviors" during the national anthem and flag-raising ceremony.

See also
 St. Francis Xavier's College
 Education in Hong Kong
 List of schools in Hong Kong
 List of Jesuit sites

References

External links

Educational institutions established in 1963
Secondary schools in Hong Kong
Marist Brothers schools
1963 establishments in Hong Kong